KRZE (1280 AM) is a radio station broadcasting a Regional Mexican format. Licensed to Farmington, New Mexico, United States, the station serves the Four Corners area. The station is owned by Basin Broadcasting Company, Inc.

On October 21, 2010, the station's license was cancelled by the Federal Communications Commission, and its call sign deleted from the FCC's database. However, the station continued to broadcast under a special temporary authority while the reinstatement of its license was pending.

On October 10, 2012, the application for extension of the special temporary authority was dismissed.  The current license expires October 1, 2021.

References

External links

Application for extension of special temporary authority

Mexican-American culture in New Mexico
RZE
Regional Mexican radio stations in the United States